The women's foil was one of seven fencing events on the fencing at the 1952 Summer Olympics programme. It was the sixth appearance of the event. The competition was held from 26 July 1952 to 27 July 1952. 37 fencers from 15 nations competed.

Competition format
The competition format was pool play round-robin, with bouts to four touches except in the final where bouts were to five touches. Not all bouts were played in some pools if not necessary to determine advancement. Ties were broken through fence-off bouts ("barrages") in early rounds if necessary for determining advancement. Ties not necessary for advancement were either not broken (if at least one fencer had not finished all bouts in the round-robin) or broken first by touches received and then by touches scored. In the final, ties were broken by barrage if necessary for medal placement but otherwise first by touches received and then by touches scored.

Results

Round 1

The top 4 finishers in each pool advanced to round 2.

Pool 1

Garilhe and Sheen defeated Cesari in a three-way barrage for third and fourth place.

Pool 2

Buller and Shitikova defeated Kalka in a three-way barrage for third and fourth place.

Pool 3

Mitchell defeated Barding-Poulsen in a barrage for fourth place.

Pool 4

Pool 5

Pool 6

Round 2

The top 4 finishers in each pool advanced to the semifinals.

Pool 1

Garilhe and Sheen defeated Cesari in a three-way barrage for third and fourth place.

Pool 2

Pool 3

Wenisch-Filz and Lecomte-Guyonneau defeated Elek and Ponomaryova in a four-way barrage for third and fourth place.

Pool 4

Glen-Haig defeated Nawrocka in a barrage for fourth place.

Semifinals

The top 4 finishers in each pool advanced to the final.

Semifinal 1

Garilhe and Sheen defeated Cesari in a three-way barrage for third and fourth place.

Semifinal 2

Final

Two separate barrages were necessary. There was a four-way barrage for the bronze medal, which was won by Lachmann. The top two fencers ended in a barrage for gold and silver; Camber defeated Elek 4–3.

References

Foil women
1952 in women's fencing
Fen